The John Henry Hammond House is a mansion at 9 East 91st Street on the Upper East Side in New York City. Since 1994, the Consulate-General of Russia in New York City has been located there.

Site
The purchase of land fronting on Fifth Avenue between 90th and 91st Streets by Andrew Carnegie, and the 1901 building of his mansion (which now houses the Cooper-Hewitt Museum), saw Carnegie buy neighboring building lots in order to protect his investment. The entire north side of 91st Street between Fifth and Madison Avenues was purchased by Carnegie. Carnegie sold off lots to individuals who agreed to build substantial dwellings, and in 1903, a home was built at 9 East 91st Street by John H. Hammond, a New York City banker. The land, and possibly the house, was a wedding gift to Hammond and his wife (Emily Vanderbilt Sloane) from her father, William Douglas Sloane of the firm W. & J. Sloane.

Architecture
The five-story Renaissance style town house was designed by Carrère and Hastings, who were also responsible for the design of the New York Public Library Main Branch, and is regarded as one of their finest residences. The design of the limestone-clad building, which unusually for a Manhattan town house offers a finished side elevation as well as its street front, is strongly influenced by 16th- and 18th-century Italian palazzo details.

The ground floor has pronounced banded rustication, a motif which is taken through the three floors above in the pilaster-like quoining at each corner of the building. The first floor piano nobile is evident by its large casement windows proportionately taller than those below or above. On the principal facade these aedicular windows have segmental pediments supported on the flanking Ionic columns; they are given extra prominence by the small wrought iron balconies supported by limestone corbels. The windows of the second floor clearly denote it as containing secondary accommodation, while the windows of the third and top floor are smaller still, clearly indicating a lower status than those below. The upper floor contains masonry panels and is intended to complement the enriched entablature, frieze and boldly projecting cornice immediately above it. 

Interior photos from the early 20th century display a "rich series of Louis XVI-style rooms with elaborate marbles, carving, tapestries and furnishings." The house had two elevators and a regulation size squash court on the fifth floor, which two generations of Hammond children found ideal for roller skating.  

The Hammonds lived in the house with their five children and 16 staff. Rachel Hammond Breck noted that her mother's parties never went for long, mainly due to her not serving alcohol. Over the 44 years that the Hammonds lived in the house, many greats of jazz played in the house, including Benny Goodman, who would later marry one of the Hammond daughters, Alice.

History
The Hammonds sold the house to noted eye surgeon Ramón Castroviejo in 1946, who slightly modified the interior of the building and began to operate an eye hospital on the top two floors. Under Castroviejo's ownership the house became noted for holding lavish parties for celebrities including British  actress Hermione Gingold and Spanish Catalan operatic soprano Victoria de los Ángeles. In 1974, over objections from Castroviejo, the Landmarks Preservation Commission designated the building as a landmark as part of the Carnegie Hill Historic District.

The Government of the Soviet Union purchased the house from Castroviejo in August 1975 for US$1.6 million, and began renovation work on the building. The Soviets also spent US$400,000 on the neighbouring townhouse and US$100,000 for half a driveway which was owned by the neighbouring Convent of the Sacred Heart school. William Gleckman, who was responsible for renovations work on the building, noted that Mr. Myshkov, the Soviet Consul-designate, admired the building as it reminded him of imperial architecture in Russia. Gleckman installed new electrical wiring, a theatre and air-conditioning. The Soviets also received permission to install a large wrought-iron gate around the mansion and closed-circuit cameras to watch over the street in front of the building. A total of US$500,000 was spent on renovations before the Soviets were ordered to leave in 1980.

After the dissolution of the Soviet Union, the Russian Federation returned to New York City in 1992 to find the building in an advanced state of disrepair. In co-operation with Random House, the Russians, including 16 artisans from Moscow, went to work on renovating the building and fixing the many problems which existed; water had seeped from the roof, floorboards squeaked and the plumbing, furnace, and elevators no longer worked. The consulate opened in 1994.

References

External links
Architectural essay on Hammond House.

  Consulate-General of Russia in New York City

1903 establishments in New York City
Houses completed in 1903
Houses in Manhattan
New York City Designated Landmarks in Manhattan
Upper East Side
Russia–United States relations
Soviet Union–United States relations